Jinn mosque is a historical mosque of the XIV century. It is a part of Old City as well as Palace of the Shirvanshahs and located on Gala turn, in the city of Baku, in Azerbaijan. The building was also registered as a national architectural monument by the decision of the Cabinet of Ministers of the Republic of Azerbaijan dated August 2, 2001, No. 132.

History
The mosque is located in the lower part of the Eastern Gate. There is no inscription on the facade of the mosque. It is believed that it was built in the XIV century and named after Jinn, a surah in Koran. It was used as a neighborhood mosque.

Architectural features
The mosque is in rectangular shape in the plan. It forms single-cell worshipping hall covered with pointed stone dome. The five-tiered corbelled mihrab carved into muqarnas is framed with a rectangle on the southern wall of the interior and forms certain motifs of architectural school of Shirvan-Absheron as a whole. Small niches were placed at the edges.

The main facade of the mosque is asymmetrical and its rigid, voluminous composition is emphasized with classic styled portal-entrance. The portal of the mosque is classical-type.

Gallery

See also
Chin Mosque
Haji Heybat Mosque
Sayyid Yahya Murtuza Mosque

References

Monuments and memorials in Azerbaijan
Mosques in Baku
Museums in Azerbaijan
Icherisheher